Mari Burelle-Valencia (born April 4, 1985, as Mari Jacqueline Burelle), who goes by the stage name stylized as MARi, is an American Christian musician and pianist, who primarily plays a style of Christian EDM. She has released one musical work, Treasure (2016).

Early life
She was born, Mari Jacqueline Burelle, on April 4, 1985, in Boston, Massachusetts, while she moved to Queens, New York, in 2002, and was raised by adoptive parents, while she started playing the piano when she was young. She is of Puerto Rican and Cuban descent.

Music career
Her music recording career started in 2016, with the studio album, Treasure, that was released on May 27, 2016, from Elevate Entertainment.

MARi would later represent New Hampshire in the American Song Contest, qualifying for the semi-finals on a public vote before being eliminated at this stage.

Personal life
She married Ivan Valencia in 2005.

Discography
Treasure (May 27, 2016, Elevate)

References

External links
 

1985 births
Living people
American performers of Christian music
Musicians from Boston
Musicians from New York City
Songwriters from Massachusetts
Songwriters from New York (state)
American people of Puerto Rican descent
American people of Cuban descent
American Song Contest contestants